Marquess of Laula is a hereditary title in the Peerage of Spain, granted in 1543 by Charles I to Adán Centurión Ultramarino, Lieutenant General of the Galleys of Spain. It was bestowed along with the titles of "Marquess of Monte de Vay" and "Marquess of Vivola".

The 11th Marquess, Iñigo Moreno y de Arteaga, who is married to Princess Teresa, Duchess of Salerno, was deprived from the title by his first cousin Iñigo de Arteaga y Martín, 19th Duke of Infantado, in 2010. After a decade of a judiciary battle in court between the two, the Ministry of Justice ruled in favour of the latter, who ceded the title to his youngest daughter, Carla María de Arteaga, becoming the 13th Marchioness of Laula. The sentence was on the basis of absolute primogeniture.

Marquesses of Laula (1543)
 Adán Centurión Ultramarino y Negri, 1st Marquess of Laula
 Juan Bautista Centurión Ultramarino y Negri, 2nd Marquess of Laula
 Adán Centurión Ultramarino y Fernández de Córdoba, 3rd Marquess of Laula
 Francisco Celilio Centurión y Guzmán, 4th Marquess of Laula
 José Centurión y Portocarrero, 5th Marquess of Laula
 Manuel Centurión y Arias Pacheco, 6th Marquess of Laula
 Juan Bautista Centurión y Velasco, 7th Marquess of Laula
 María Luisa Centurión y Velasco, 8th Marchioness of Laula
 Joaquín Ignacio de Arteaga y Echagüe, 9th Marquess of Laula
 María Belén de Arteaga y Falguera, 10th Marchioness of Laula
 Iñigo Moreno y de Arteaga, 11th Marquess of Laula
 Iñigo de Arteaga y Martín, 12th Marquess of Laula
 Carla María de Arteaga y del Álcazar, 13th Marchioness of Laula

See also
 Marquess of Estepa
 Marquess of Laserna

References

Marquesses of Spain
Lists of Spanish nobility
Noble titles created in 1543